Chadwick Hudson Pinder (born March 29, 1992) is an American professional baseball utility player in the Cincinnati Reds organization. He has played in Major League Baseball (MLB) for the Oakland Athletics.

Amateur career
Pinder attended Poquoson High School in Virginia. He and teammate Kyle Crockett led their high school baseball team to state championships in 2009 and 2010.

Pinder played college baseball at Virginia Tech for the Hokies from 2011 to 2013. He played in 150 games, hitting .322/.389/.509 with 18 home runs. In 2012, he played collegiate summer baseball with the Chatham Anglers of the Cape Cod Baseball League.

Professional career

Oakland Athletics
The Oakland Athletics selected Pinder in the second round of the 2013 Major League Baseball draft. He made his professional debut for the Vermont Lake Monsters that year and spent the whole season there, batting .200 with three home runs and eight RBIs in 42 games. In 2014, he played in 94 games with the Stockton Ports, hitting .288 with 13 home runs and 55 RBIs. In 2015, he played for the Midland RockHounds where he slashed .317/.361/.486 with 15 home runs and 86 RBIs in 117 games. Pinder won the Texas League Player of the Year Award that season. After the season, he played in the Arizona Fall League. He began the 2016 season with the Nashville Sounds. 

Pinder was promoted to the Athletics on August 17, 2016. Prior to his promotion, he was batting .258 with 14 home runs and 51 RBIs in 107 games for the Sounds. He made his major league debut on August 20. Pinder spent the remainder of 2016 with Oakland after his promotion, batting .235 with one home run in 22 games. In 2017, he began the season with Nashville, but was recalled on April 16 for the rest of the season. In 87 games for the Athletics, he slashed .238/.292/.457 with 15 home runs and 42 RBIs. In 2019, Pinder hit .240 with 13 home runs and 47 RBI in 124 games. In 2020 for the Athletics, Pinder slashed .232/.295/.393 with 2 home runs in only 61 plate appearances. In 2021, he slashed .243/.300/.411 with 6 home runs and 27 RBIs in 75 games. In 2022, he slashed .235/.263/.385 with 12 home runs and 42 RBIs in 111 games. He became a free agent following the season.

Cincinnati Reds
On January 30, 2023, Pinder signed a minor league contract with the Cincinnati Reds organization that included an invitation to Spring Training.

Personal life
Pinder's brother, Chase, played college baseball for the Clemson Tigers and was selected in the seventh round of the 2017 Major League Baseball draft by the St. Louis Cardinals and currently plays in their organization.

References

External links

Virginia Tech Hokies bio

1992 births
Living people
Baseball players from Richmond, Virginia
Major League Baseball second basemen
Oakland Athletics players
Virginia Tech Hokies baseball players
Vermont Lake Monsters players
Stockton Ports players
Midland RockHounds players
Mesa Solar Sox players
Nashville Sounds players
Chatham Anglers players
Las Vegas Aviators players